Luis Lacalle Pou, the 42nd and current president of Uruguay, has made 10 international trips to five countries during his Presidency so far, which began with his inauguration.

Summary 
The number of visits per country where President Lacalle Pou traveled are:
 One: Argentina, Chile, Democratic Republic of Congo, Mexico, Paraguay, Qatar, the United Arab Emirates, the United Kingdom and the United States
 Two: Brazil

2021

2022

2023

See also 

 Foreign relations of Uruguay

References 

Luis Alberto Lacalle Pou
Lacalle Pou
Lacalle Pou